Patricia Guadalupe Peña Recio (born 28 December 1977) is a Mexican politician affiliated with the PRI. As of 2013 she served as Deputy of the LXII Legislature of the Mexican Congress representing Veracruz as replacement of Joaquín Caballero Rosiñol.

References

1977 births
Living people
Politicians from Veracruz
Women members of the Chamber of Deputies (Mexico)
Institutional Revolutionary Party politicians
21st-century Mexican politicians
21st-century Mexican women politicians
Deputies of the LXII Legislature of Mexico
Members of the Chamber of Deputies (Mexico) for Veracruz